Wisdom Mumba Chansa (April 17, 1964 – April 28, 1993) was a Zambian football player who died in the 1993 air crash off the coast of Gabon that killed 18 players of the Zambian national team.

Career
Chansa began his career with the youth team of Rhokana United, before moving to  city rivals Power Dynamos in 1980 and quickly established himself in their side as an  out-and-out striker before he adapted himself to a deeper lying role as second striker. Chansa became the first African, along with Pearson Mwanza and Derby Makinka, to play in the Soviet Top League when they all signed for Pomir Dushanbe in 1989 after being spotted during their 4–0 win over Italy at the 1988 Olympics. Chansa's debut came on 2 October 1989 in an away match against Torpedo Moscow, before appearing twice more, against Rotor Volgograd and Metalist Kharkiv, before leaving at the conclusion of the 1989 season.
Chansa returned to Power Dynamos following his Soviet experience, and was made captain before Power Dynamos became the first Zambian club side to win a continental cup when they beat Nigeria's BCC Lions in the 1991 African Cup Winners' Cup final over two legs.
In 1993 Chansa had signed for Dynamos in South Africa before his death in the plane crash that killed 18 players of the Zambia national team off the coast of Libreville, Gabon on 27 April 1993.

International career
Chansa made his international debut at junior level when he was instrumental in the Zambia's cup success in the regional U-20 COSAFA Cup in 1983. Chansa made his debut for Zambia in 1985, was called up to the squad for the 1988 Summer Olympics, and was a permanent feature in the Zambian side until his death.

References

External links
 
 

1964 births
1993 deaths
Zambian footballers
Zambian expatriate footballers
Zambia international footballers
CSKA Pamir Dushanbe players
Soviet Top League players
Olympic footballers of Zambia
Footballers at the 1988 Summer Olympics
1990 African Cup of Nations players
1992 African Cup of Nations players
Victims of aviation accidents or incidents in Gabon
Expatriate footballers in the Soviet Union
Power Dynamos F.C. players
Association football midfielders
Dynamos F.C. (South Africa) players
Footballers killed in the 1993 Zambia national football team plane crash